Christmas Time with Oleta is a holiday album by the American vocalist, pianist and songwriter Oleta Adams and was released in 2006.

Track listing

Personnel 
 Oleta Adams – lead vocals, vocal arrangements, backing vocals (1, 2, 4), arrangements (1-5, 7-10), keyboards (1, 2, 4, 7, 8, 9), synthesizers (1, 2, 4, 8, 10), acoustic piano (3, 6), bass programming (3, 8), all instruments (5), cello arrangements (7)
 Greg Clark – backing vocals (1, 2, 4), vocal arrangements (2)
 John Cushon – cymbals, drums (1-4, 6, 8, 9), percussion programming (4, 6), keyboards (6), synthesizers (6), arrangements (6)
 Jimmy Dykes – guitars (2, 4)
 Beth McCullom – cello (7)
 Lonnie McFadden – trumpet (2, 8)
 Ronald McFadden – alto saxophone (2, 8)
 Al Turner – bass guitar (1, 2, 4, 9)
 Tammy Ward Clayton – backing vocals (1, 2, 4)

Production 
 Producer, Liner Notes – Oleta Adams
 A&R Direction – David Wilkes
 Engineered and Mixed by Dave Lohr
 Recorded at DML Audio (Littleton, CO); The Booth and The Cave (Shawnee, KN).
 Mixed at DML Audio (Littleton, CO).
 Mastered by Eric Conn at Independent Mastering (Nashville, TN).
 Design – Studio Eric Wondergem BNO (Baarn, Netherlands).
 Photography – Randee St. Nicholas
 Management – Chevy Nash

References 
 Personnel : https://www.discogs.com/fr/Oleta-Adams-Christmas-Time-With-Oleta/release/2340758

2006 Christmas albums
Oleta Adams albums
Christmas albums by American artists